The Wisconsin Rapids Rafters are a baseball team based in Wisconsin Rapids, Wisconsin that plays in the Northwoods League, a collegiate summer baseball league. The Rafters play home games at historic Witter Field.

History
The Rafters name was announced in a logo unveiling ceremony on January 27, 2010.

The team posted a 20-50 record in its first season in the Northwoods League. It drew 46,515 fans, ranking 7th of 16 teams in the Northwoods League. Rafters General Manager, Liz Kern, was named 2010 Northwoods League Executive of the Year for her efforts in starting the franchise. In its second season (2011) the team posted a 24-46 record. The team drew 48,006 fans during its second season, again ranking 7th of 16 teams in the league. The Rafters hosted the 2011 Marshfield Clinic Northwoods League All-Star Game. Thirty three players that appeared in the All-Star Game went on to play professional baseball.

2010 season 
The first half of the Northwoods League season saw the Rafters post an 11-22 record. The second half their record was 9-28, for a 20-50 season record. The Rafters concluded their inaugural season in front of a record crowd of 2,415 at Witter Field on August 16 by defeating the Battle Creek Bombers 5-4. The Rafters ranked 7th of 16 teams in the Northwoods League in attendance, with an average attendance of 1,368 per game.

2011 season 
The Rafters lost all five of their season opening games, with an average of 1,300 fans in attendance. They went 24-46 on the season.

Rafters fans voted left-handed pitcher Nestor Bautista the 2011 Rafters MVP. He was 3-4 on the season, with a 3.75 earned run average. Pitcher Joey Wagman played for the team.

The 2011 season brought the Rafters their first franchise draft pick when the Boston Red Sox selected Cody Koback in the 10th round of the MLB amateur draft.

The team hosted the 2011 Marshfield Clinic Northwoods League All-Star Game at Historic Witter Field, where Hall of Famer Paul Molitor tossed out the first pitch.

2012 season 
The Rafters finished first half of the season with a 16-18 record, placing them fifth in the South Division. Their overall season record was 27-42.

The team welcomed its 100,000th fan through the gates on June 6 and celebrated its 100th home game on August 3.

2013 season 
The Rafters finished the first half of the season with a 19-16 record, placing them fourth in the South Division. It was the first time they had finished a half above .500. The Rafters had a 31-39 overall record for the season.

The team extended its lease with the City of Wisconsin Rapids through 2020 and added a new addition to the ballpark for groups, the Element Mobile Rat Trap.

2014 season 
The team finished the season with an overall record of 27-45.

The Rafters unveiled a new Interactive Accessible Seating Area, in partnership with the Northwoods League Foundation.

2015 season 
The team finished the season with an overall record of 33-35, in manager Craig Noto's first season with the team. The Rafters introduced the "Point Craft River", a waterway within the grounds where a small raft could be floated carrying beer from local brewer Stevens Point Brewery.

2016 season 
The team finished the season with an overall record of 49-23.

2017 season 
The team finished the season with an overall record of 52-20 (52 wins in 2017 stands as the single-season Northwoods League record.)

2018 season 
The team finished the season with an overall record of 34-37.

2019 season 
The season started on May 31 with new General Manager Andy Francis taking over from John Fanta. Eight current and former Rafters players were drafted to Major League Baseball in the 2019 First-Year Player Draft.

2020 season 
The Northwoods League season was shortened to 46 games due to the Covid-19 pandemic. Wisconsin Rapids went 35-11, the best winning percentage in Northwoods League history.

2021 season 
The season started on May 31 with new field manager Kirk Shrider taking over for Craig Noto who stepped down before the season after taking the head coaching position at Wagner College. The team finished the season with an overall record of 38-34. On August 8, 2021, Nathan Hemmerling and Brayden Bonner threw the Rafters first ever combined no hitter. Wisconsin Rapids won 7-0 in a seven inning game.

References

External links
Wisconsin Rapids Rafters official site
Northwoods League official site

Northwoods League teams
Amateur baseball teams in Wisconsin
Sports in Wisconsin Rapids, Wisconsin